The Žvėrynas Bridge is a bridge over the Neris River in Vilnius, Lithuania. It connects Naujamiestis with the district of Žvėrynas.

History 
The bridge was first built of timber in 1892 by a landowner in Žvėrynas. The landowner hoped to make Žvėrynas a part of the Vilnius city, as it was a suburb at that time. The bridge was rebuilt by the city in 1906 using a steel structure with stone piers. It was overhauled in 1937. The bridge suffered significant damage during the World War II but was repaired quite quickly. In 1991, during the January Events, defensive barricades were built on the bridge.

In 2014, LED lighting was installed for colourful illuminations in the evenings.

Gallery

References 

Bridges in Vilnius
Road bridges in Lithuania
Bridges completed in 1906